The Lokmanya Tilak Terminus–Prayagraj Duronto Express, also known as LTT–Prayagraj Duronto Express is a Duronto Express train of the Indian Railways connecting Lokmanya Tilak Terminus (LTT) to Prayagraj Junction (PRYG). It is the forty-fourth fastest-running train in India and the fastest train between Mumbai and Prayagraj. It is currently being operated with 12293 / 12294 train numbers.

Train details

This train had its inaugural run on 11 March 2012 as train number 01093 from Lokmanya Tilak Terminus to Prayagraj Junction. Regular services commenced on 13 March 2012 as train no. 12294 & on 16 March 2012 as train no. 12293. It is a fully AC train & previously it used refurbished ICF Rajdhani Coaches.

Technical stoppages
Being a Duronto Express train, it had no commercial halts between its terminal stops. However, later many of its technical halts are converted into commercial halts because of low response to Duronto Express trains. It takes 7 minutes at Kasara for addition of banker engine for the run through the ghats, Igatpuri of about 5 minutes for the removal of bankers, at Bhusaval of about 5 minutes for crew change, Itarsi for 20 minutes for locomotive change, Satna Junction for 10 mins for breakfast pick up.

12293 Down Mumbai LTT–Prayagraj AC Duronto Express

12294 UP Prayagraj–Mumbai LTT AC Duronto Express

Coaches
The Mumbai–Prayagraj Duronto Express has one AC 1st Class coach, three AC 2 tier class coaches, one pantry cars, two luggage-cum-generator coaches & up to eight AC 3 tier coaches taking the total up to 15 coaches.

12294 is the reverse composition of the above 12293.
B- Three Tier AC Sleeper (Third AC), A- Two Tier AC Sleeper (Second AC), H- AC First class cabins (First AC), PC-Pantry (Hot buffet) car, EOG/GV-Generator van cum Guard van

Traction 
Now the route is fully  electrified, a WAP-7 from the Electric Loco Shed, Ajni  hauls the train from Lokmanya Tilak Terminus to Prayagraj Junction.

References

Transport in Mumbai
Trains from Allahabad
Duronto Express trains
Rail transport in Maharashtra
Rail transport in Madhya Pradesh
Railway services introduced in 2012